Philip Bennett, Phillip Bennett or similar may refer to:

Philip Allen Bennett (1881–1942), American politician and Republican member of Congress
Philip Bennett (Washington Post), American journalist and professor
Phil Bennett (1948–2022), Welsh rugby union player
Phil Bennett (racing driver) (born 1971), English racing driver
Phil Bennett (American football) (born 1955), American collegiate football coach
Phillip Bennett (born 1928), Australian general and Governor of Tasmania
Phillip R. Bennett (born 1948), British CEO

See also 
Philip Bennet (disambiguation)